Pulchrocladia is a genus of fruticose lichens in the family Cladoniaceae. It has three species. The genus was circumscribed in 2018 by lichenologists Soili Stenroos, Raquel Pino-Bodas, Helge Thorsten Lumbsch, and Teuvo Ahti. The genus name (from the Latin pulchro, meaning "pretty" or "beautiful") refers to "the beautiful morphology of its species".

Species
Pulchrocladia corallaizon 
Pulchrocladia ferdinandii 
Pulchrocladia retipora

References

Cladoniaceae
Lecanorales genera
Lichen genera
Taxa described in 2018
Taxa named by Teuvo Ahti